Brownshill Dolmen (Dolmain Chnoc an Bhrúnaigh in Irish) is a very large megalithic portal tomb situated 3 km east of Carlow, in County Carlow, Ireland. Its capstone weighs an estimated 150 metric tons, and is reputed to be the heaviest in Europe. The tomb is listed as a National Monument. Known as the Kernanstown Cromlech, sometimes spelled as Browneshill Dolmen, it is sited on the former estate house of the Browne family from which it takes its name.

The tomb was built between 4000 and 3000 BC. It is distinguished for the flanking of its burial chamber with two large upright stones (orthostats) supporting the granite capstone (roof) of the chamber. The capstone is thought to have been covered by an earthen mound and a gate stone blocked the entrance. At Brownshill both portal stones and the gate-stone are still in situ; the capstone lies on top of the portals and gate-stone and slopes to the ground away from the entrance.

The dolmen has not been excavated. A nearby fourth upright stone stands close by and might be the remains of a forecourt.

References

Archaeological sites in County Carlow
Buildings and structures in Carlow (town)
Dolmens in Ireland
National Monuments in County Carlow
Tombs in the Republic of Ireland